Pye v. Renshaw, is a High Court of Australia case that deals with the interaction between section 51(xxxi) of the Constitution, (the Commonwealth's power to acquire property on just terms) and section 96 of the Constitution (the grants power).

This case followed from P. J. Magennis Pty. Ltd. v. Commonwealth, which held that a Commonwealth law to purchase land via the New South Wales government was invalid. The Commonwealth amended the law, such that the reference to acquisition of land was removed.

The Court held that the law was valid; thus, the Commonwealth was able to get around the restrictions in section 51(xxxi) by ensuring that the law could not be characterised as land acquisition. Hence, section 51(xxxi) does not restrict the section 96 grants power.

See also 
 Australian constitutional law

References 

 Winterton, G. et al. Australian federal constitutional law: commentary and materials, 1999. LBC Information Services, Sydney.

High Court of Australia cases
Acquisition of property in the Australian Constitution cases
1951 in Australian law
Australian constitutional law
Grants power in the Australian Constitution cases
1951 in case law